The  were Japanese suicide motorboats developed during World War II. They were part of the wider Japanese Special Attack Units program.

History
Towards the end of 1943, in response to unfavorable progress in the war, the Japanese high command heard suggestions for various suicide craft. These suggestions were initially rejected as "defeatist" but later deemed necessary. For the naval department this meant kamikaze planes, kaiten submarines, fukuryu suicide divers or human mines, and shinyo suicide boats.

Characteristics
These attack boats also carried two anti-ship rockets mounted on launchers located on either side of the boat behind the driver.

The similar Maru-Ni, which were used by the Imperial Japanese Army, were equipped with two depth charges, and were not actually suicide boats, as the idea was to drop the depth charges and then turn around before the explosion took place. Although the chances of the boat and crew surviving the wave from the explosion might seem slim, a small number of crewmen successfully escaped. The depth charges used were known as the Experimental Manufacture Use 120 kg Depth Charge, and were armed by a delayed-action pull igniter.

The program began in March 1944. The first vessels were tested on 27 May, after which it was decided that the original steel hull design would be replaced by a wooden hull due to the Japanese steel shortage. On 1 August, 150 students, on average 17 years old, elected to begin training for the Shinyo.

6,197 Shinyo  boats were produced for the Imperial Japanese Navy and 3,000 Maru-ni for the Imperial Japanese Army. Around 400 boats were transported to Okinawa and Formosa, and the rest were stored on the coast of Japan for the ultimate defense against the expected invasion of the Home islands. The main operative use took place during the Philippines Campaign of 1944–45.

Operational results
January 10, 1945: Sinking of American ships USS LCI(G)-365 (Landing Craft Infantry – Gunboat), USS LCI(M)-974 (Landing Craft Infantry – Mortar) and crippling of USS War Hawk (an auxiliary transport) in Lingayen Gulf, Luzon, Philippines.
February 16, 1945: Sinking of USS LCS(L)-7 (Landing Craft Support – Large), LCS(L)-26, and LCS(L)-49 off Mariveles, Corregidor Channel, Luzon.

See also
List of Allied vessels struck by Japanese special attack weapons

References

Bibliography

External links
Japanese Suicide Weapons
Explosive Motorboats based at Okinawa 1944–1945

World War II suicide weapons of Japan
Minor warship classes
Motorboats
Ships built in Japan